Sky TG24 is Italy's second all-news channel, owned by Sky Italia.

Launched on 31 July 2003, it provides non-stop rolling news, weather forecasts and sports stories with half-hourly updates.

Overview
Part of Sky TG24's programming is available on the television channels Cielo and TV8.

In the United States, Sky TG24 is available on cable via RCN in Boston, Chicago, New York City, Philadelphia and Washington D.C..  From December 2004 to 7 December 2008 it was available via satellite on DirecTV.  It was removed due to low subscriber levels. 

A local Canadian version of Sky TG24 airs in Canada. It is owned by Telelatino Network Inc. Most of its content is  simulcast with the Italian channel, with Canadian content.

The channel has been available in high definition since September 2013, making it the 63rd HDTV channel offered by Sky Italia.

Sky TG24 Active 
This was the interactive version of Sky TG24. It provided video on demand of news and sports news, the Sky TG24 live stream, and access to Sky Meteo 24 ACTIVE. The service sometimes presented a survey for the day's most important issues and the viewer must use the remote to answer.

It closed on September 16, 2019.

Sky TG24 Primo Piano 
A 24-hour headline news service, featuring 10 most important news every 15 minutes. Live on channel 501.

Sky TG24 Eventi 
The channel provided interviews and in-depth reports on the day's issues.

It closed on September 16, 2019.

Sky TG24 Rassegna 
The channel filled in the content of the main channel Sky TG24, with press reviews from 7am.

It closed on September 16, 2019.

Sky Meteo 24 

A 24-hour weather news service, featuring national and European weather every 15 minutes. Live on channel 502.

Editor-in-chief
 2003-2011 - Emilio Carelli
 2011-2018 - Sarah Varetto
 2019-present - Giuseppe De Bellis

Logos

References

External links
Sky TG24 on sky.it 

Sky Italia
24-hour television news channels in Italy
Italian-language television stations
Television channels and stations established in 2003